Convoy HG 53 was the 53rd of the numbered series of World War II HG convoys of Homeward bound merchant ships from Gibraltar to Liverpool. Convoy HG 53 lost nine ships during a coordinated attack in February 1941. HG 53 was one of the few Atlantic convoys to have ships sunk by submarines, by aircraft, and by surface ships.

Background
The convoy commodore was Rear Admiral Sir OH Dawson aboard Dagmar.

Action

While southbound to African waters on the evening of 8 February German Type IX submarine  sighted the convoy southwest of Cape St. Vincent and torpedoed the British freighters Courland and Estrellano after midnight. U-37 reported the convoy to Bordeaux-Mérignac Air Base and commenced shadowing the convoy providing beacon signals for Kampfgeschwader 40. The Fw 200s bombed from an altitude of  because they lacked bombsights. Each flight mechanic fired at their target ship with a ventral machine gun during the approach to discourage anti-aircraft gunners; but one of the bombers was hit in a wing fuel tank and crash-landed in Spain when fuel was exhausted on the return trip. Six of the twenty bombs dropped hit ships, sinking the convoy commodore's freighter Dagmar, the Norwegian freighter Tejo, and British freighters Britannic, Jura, and Varna. Admiral Hipper found and sank the straggling British freighter Iceland on 11 February.

Aftermath
Hipper was distracted from further search by finding convoy SL 64 and sinking seven ships from that unescorted convoy. The surviving 12 ships of convoy HG 53 arrived in Liverpool on 24 February 1941. Nine ships totaling 15,217 GRT had been sunk.

Merchant ships in convoy

See also
 Convoy Battles of World War II

Notes

Sources
 
 
 
 

HG053
C